Champlain College Saint-Lambert (French: Collège Champlain Saint-Lambert) is an English-language college in Saint-Lambert, Quebec, Canada that is part of Quebec's CEGEP public education system. It is a campus of Champlain Regional College, and primarily serves the South Shore of Montreal. Like the other campuses of Champlain Regional College, the Saint-Lambert campus is an English-language public post-secondary institution that offers both pre-university and career programs.

History
Champlain College was established shortly after the Quebec Government passed the General and Vocational Act in 1967. This Act is better known for the creation of a distinct college level, the CEGEP, between high-school and university. Later in 1969, English public colleges were inaugurated. Champlain Regional College was recognized on April 7, 1971. The school is named after the famous explorer, Samuel de Champlain. The Champlain Colleges are set out to serve English speakers in Quebec City (Champlain St-Lawrence), Eastern Townships (Champlain Lennoxville) and South Shore of Montreal areas (Champlain St-Lambert). Champlain College Saint-Lambert is the biggest institution out of the three campuses; it is home to approximately 2700 students. The official inauguration of the St-Lambert college grounds was held on October 23, 1976.

Controversy Over the Multi-Regional Structure
A movement has emerged over time among faculty and staff in favour of establishing Champlain St-Lambert as an independent cégep and eliminating the Sherbrooke Central Administration offices. This movement also exists at the St-Lawrence campus. It has the official support of five of the six labour unions at the St-Lambert and St-Lawrence campuses, a large number of students, the CSN labour central, and the Fédération Nationale des enseignantes et enseignants du Québec (Quebec National Teachers Federation or FNEEQ). It first developed in the 1990s but resurfaced in 2014 and has caused significant debate at the Board of Governors. The administration in Sherbrooke both expresses concern over this movement and disparages it, with the chair of the Board of Governors publicly calling it "childish".

Programs
The college offers two types of programs: pre-university and career. The pre-university programs, which take two years to complete, cover the subject matters which roughly correspond to the additional year of high school given elsewhere in Canada in preparation for a chosen field in university. The career programs, which take three-years to complete, applies to students who wish to pursue a skill trade. In addition Continuing Education and services to business are provided to the local community.

Pre-University Programs
Science Program — Pure & Applied Sciences Option
Science Program — Computer Science and Mathematics
Science Program — Health Sciences Option
Social Science — Choice Option
Social Science — Commerce Option
Social Science — Education Option
Social Science — Criminology Option
Social Science — Psychology Option
Social Science — World Studies Option
Creative Arts, Languages & Literature — Digital Media and Film & Media Options
Description:

Creative Arts, Languages & Literature — Modern Languages Option
Law and Civilization and Law, Civilization and Mathematics - Liberal Arts

Career Programs
Entrepreneurship (Business Management)
Sport Marketing & Management Option (Business Management)
Tourism Management Option (Tourism)
Legacy to Mobile (Computer Science)
Nursing

Extracurricular activities
Each year, teams of students represent the college in the Tournoi Jeunes Démocrates, organized in and by the National Assembly of Quebec. The Champlain College St. Lawrence team won the gold medal in the 2001 edition, and Champlain Saint-Lambert won gold in 2011. Since 2012, only Champlain Saint-Lambert teams have participated in the tournament.

Sports
Champlain College Saint-Lambert hosted their first CCAA National Championship in Men's Basketball in 2008. Since then, the college has played host to the 2012 CCAA Cross-Country Running Nationals and the 2014 CCAA Women's Basketball Nationals.

Champlain College is represents in sports and Esports by their team The Cavaliers. The college has teams in various sports such as badminton, basketball, flag football, soccer, volleyball, cross-country running and Rugby. In addition, Rugby is one of the oldest sports at Champlain College. Both the women's and men's teams were developed at the same time

See also
List of colleges in Quebec
Higher education in Quebec

References

External links
Champlain College Saint-Lambert (official website)
 Champlain Regional College Website

Quebec CEGEP
Educational institutions established in 1972
English-language universities and colleges in Quebec
Education in Longueuil
Education in Saint-Lambert, Quebec
Buildings and structures in Saint-Lambert, Quebec
1972 establishments in Quebec